Bernard Edmund Neis (September 26, 1895 – November 29, 1972) was an American professional baseball outfielder. He played in Major League Baseball (MLB) for the Brooklyn Robins, Boston Braves, Cleveland Indians, and Chicago White Sox between 1920 and 1927. He managed in the minor leagues in 1932 and 1933.

In 677 games over eight seasons, Neis posted a .272 batting average (496-for-1825) with 297 runs, 25 home runs and 210 RBIs. He recorded a .950 fielding percentage playing at all three outfield positions.

References

External links

1895 births
1972 deaths
Major League Baseball outfielders
Brooklyn Robins players
Boston Braves players
Cleveland Indians players
Chicago White Sox players
Baseball players from Illinois
Peoria Distillers players
Minneapolis Millers (baseball) players
Saskatoon Quakers players
Buffalo Bisons (minor league) players
Seattle Indians players
Columbus Senators players
Knoxville Smokies players
Rochester Red Wings players
Huntington Boosters players
Palatka Azaleas players
Minor league baseball managers
People from Inverness, Florida